Sassoon David Sassoon (August 1832 – 24 June 1867) was a British Indian businessman, banker, and philanthropist.

Biography

Early life
Sassoon was born in August 1832 in Bombay, India. He was a member of the Sassoon family. His father was David Sassoon (1792–1864), a leading trader of cotton and opium who served as the treasurer of Baghdad between 1817 and 1829, and his mother was Farha Hayim of Baghdad.  He suffered from poor health from infancy but travelled widely.

He was educated in biblical and Talmudic lore in Baghdad. He also spoke several Oriental languages with great fluency.

Business career
He proceeded to Shanghai, where he conducted the mercantile operations of the Chinese branch of the firm of David Sassoon, Sons & Co. He went to London in 1858, where he opened a bank on Leadenhall Street. The business grew exponentially during the American Civil War, as they suddenly became the main suppliers of cotton to British spinning mills and the British market.

Philanthropy
He served as President of a committee which had for its object the organization of an expedition to the Jews in China, Abyssinia, and the East. He was also a member of the council of Jews' College and of the committee of the Jews' Free School, which two institutions he munificently endowed. He was also a warden of the Spanish and Portuguese Synagogue. For several years, he acted as examiner in Hebrew to the Jews' Free School.

Personal life
At the age of 18, he married a cousin Farha Reuben (1838–1919) of Mumbai, daughter of Solomon Reuben Sassoon of Baghdad. She later changed her name to Flora in England. They had four children giving rise to his grandchildren as follows:
Joseph Sassoon Sassoon (1855–1918; married Louise de Gunzburg, a daughter of Horace Günzburg
Sassoon Joseph Sassoon (1885-1922), army officer
Arthur Meyer Sassoon, army officer
Frederick Sassoon, army officer
4 other grandchildren
Rachel Sassoon (later Beer), editor, (1858–1927; married Frederick Arthur Beer, son of Julius Beer).
Alfred Ezra Sassoon (1861–1895; married Theresa Thornycroft
Michael Thorneycroft Sassoon (1884-1969)
Siegfried Sassoon
Hamo Watts Sassoon, army officer, (1887 - killed 1 Nov 1915)
Frederick Meyer Sassoon (1862–1889)
two granddaughters
They lived at Ashley Park in Walton-on-Thames, Surrey and equally at 17 Cumberland Terrace next to Regent's Park in St Pancras, London. He died in 1867 in London, leaving an estate of £120,000. Later, Flora moved to 37 Adelaide Crescent in Hove, East Sussex.

References

Further reading

1832 births
1867 deaths
British Jews
British people of Indian-Jewish descent
British people of Iraqi-Jewish descent
Indian emigrants to the United Kingdom
Businesspeople from Mumbai
People from Surrey
Sassoon family
Indian people of Iraqi-Jewish descent
19th-century British businesspeople